Dihydrostreptomycin is a derivative of streptomycin that has a bactericidal properties. It is a semisynthetic aminoglycoside antibiotic used in the treatment of tuberculosis.

It acts by irreversibly binding the S12 protein in the bacterial 30S ribosomal subunit, after being actively transported across the cell membrane, which interferes with the initiation complex between the mRNA and the bacterial ribosome. This leads to the synthesis of defective, nonfunctional proteins, which results in the bacterial cell's death.

It causes ototoxicity, which is why it is no longer used in humans.

See also 
 Translation (biology)

References

External links 
 Dihydrostreptomycin | C21H41N7O12 - PubChem

Aminoglycoside antibiotics
Guanidines